Letchworth Garden City station serves the town of Letchworth in Hertfordshire, England. Trains which serve the station are operated by Great Northern.

History
The first station known as Letchworth Garden City was opened in 1903, with a restricted service; it gained a full passenger service on 15 April 1905. On 18 May 1913, this station was replaced by a new station on a different site. The new station was built in 1912, in the Arts and Crafts style, and has since been Grade II listed.

The station was originally intended to have two island platforms, giving a total of four platforms. However, since its opening only two platforms have been used. It was known from October 1937 as Letchworth, until it regained its current name on 11 June 1999 following a refurbishment scheme. Electric operation at the station was inaugurated in 1978, as part of the Kings Cross Outer Suburban scheme, though the wires initially ended at Royston.  Through electric services to Cambridge began in May 1988.

The platforms were extended initially for eight carriages, and further extended in December 2011 for 12-carriage trains.

Passenger lifts were installed in two new towers in March 2014.

To the north of the station are the sidings where trains starting or terminating at Letchworth are cleaned and stabled.

Ticket barriers are in operation.

The station was used as a filming location for the 2013 film The World's End; it was converted into a pub named "The Hole in the Wall".

Services
Off-peak, all services at Letchworth Garden City are operated by Thameslink using  EMUs.

The typical off-peak service in trains per hour is:

These services run non-stop to and from London King's Cross and are operated using Great Northern using  EMUs.

On weekends, one of the hourly services between London and Cambridge terminates at Royston. On Sundays, the service between Brighton and Cambridge is reduced to hourly.

In popular culture
Letchworth Station (Oil on canvas, 1911) by Spencer Gore is notable as an early depiction of rail commuters. From the collection of J. Peter W. Cochrane.

References

External links

Grade II listed buildings in Hertfordshire
Railway stations in Hertfordshire
DfT Category D stations
Former Great Northern Railway stations
Railway stations served by Govia Thameslink Railway
Grade II listed railway stations
Railway stations in Great Britain opened in 1903
Letchworth
Buildings and structures in Letchworth